The 1963 California Golden Bears football team was an American football team that represented the University of California, Berkeley in the Athletic Association of Western Universities (AAWU) during the 1963 NCAA University Division football season. In its fourth year under head coach Marv Levy, the team compiled a 4–5–1 record (1–3 against AAWU opponents), finished in fifth place in the AAWU, and was outscored by its opponents by a combined total of 213 to 195.

The team's statistical leaders included Craig Morton with 1,475 passing yards, Tom Blanchfield with 387 rushing yards, and Jack Schraub with 467 receiving yards. Morton was later inducted into the College Football Hall of Fame.

Schedule

Roster

References

California
California Golden Bears football seasons
California Golden Bears football